Samuel P. Williams House, also known as "Old Home", is a historic home located at Howe, Lima Township, LaGrange County, Indiana.  It was built between 1838 and 1843, and is a Western Reserve style frame dwelling.  It consists of a -story central block with -story symmetrical wings.  Also on the property is a contributing carriage barn constructed in the 1840s.

It was listed in the National Register of Historic Places in 1980.

References

Houses on the National Register of Historic Places in Indiana
Houses completed in 1843
Buildings and structures in LaGrange County, Indiana
National Register of Historic Places in LaGrange County, Indiana